Green Mountain National Forest is a national forest located in Vermont, a temperate broadleaf and mixed forest typical of the New England/Acadian forests ecoregion. The forest supports a variety of wildlife, including beaver, moose, coyote, black bear, white-tailed deer, wild turkey, and ruffed grouse. The forest, being situated in Vermont's Green Mountains, has been referred to as the granite backbone of the state.

GMNF is one of only two national forest areas in New England, the other area being the White Mountain National Forest in New Hampshire.

In descending order of land area, GMNF is located in parts of Bennington, Addison, Rutland, Windham, Windsor, and Washington counties. The forest headquarters are in Rutland, Vermont, alongside those of Finger Lakes National Forest though that forest is in New York state.

The forest contains three nationally designated trails, including parts of the Appalachian Trail and the Long Trail, as well as the Robert Frost National Recreation Trail.

The forest benefited from the American Reinvestment and Recovery Act of 2009. Forest revenue is generated by recreation fees (such as at Mount Snow, Stratton Mountain and Bromley Mountain ski areas) and timber sales. About  were set aside for forest regeneration in 2009. Planned expenditures include road construction, recreation and heritage, and wildlife management. Projects in the latter category include: land/water modification in support of ruffed grouse, wild turkeys, bear, trout, salmon, Bicknell's thrush, and the plant Jacob's ladder. The emerald ash borer is a threat to Vermont's trees.

Wilderness areas

There are eight officially designated wilderness areas in the Green Mountain National Forest (from north to south):

Each of these wilderness areas is wholly located in Vermont and is managed by the United States Forest Service as part of the National Wilderness Preservation System. As such, these areas are off-limits to all motorized and mechanical vehicles, including bicycles.

Recreation areas

There are two officially designated recreation areas in the Green Mountain National Forest (from north to south):

The latter includes both the Big Branch Wilderness and Peru Peak Wilderness within its boundaries.

See also
List of U.S. National Forests

References

External links

Official website

 
National Forests of Vermont
National Forests of the Appalachians
Natural history of Vermont
Protected areas of Addison County, Vermont
Protected areas of Bennington County, Vermont
Protected areas of Rutland County, Vermont
Protected areas of Washington County, Vermont
Protected areas of Windham County, Vermont
Protected areas of Windsor County, Vermont
Champlain Valley National Heritage Area
Protected areas established in 1932
1932 establishments in Vermont